The Ndendeule are ethnic Ngoni of Namtumbo District in Ruvuma Region, Tanzania, who speak the Ndendeule language. In 2000 the Ndendeule population was estimated to number 100,000.

References

Ethnic groups in Tanzania
Indigenous peoples of East Africa